Carex davyi, or Davy's sedge, is a species of sedge that was first described by Kenneth Mackenzie in 1917. It is native to California.

References

davyi
Plants described in 1917